Vita Marissa (born 4 January 1981) is an Indonesian retired badminton player.

Career 
Marissa competed in badminton at the 2004 Summer Olympics in mixed doubles with partner Nova Widianto. They had a bye in the first round and defeated Robert Blair and Natalie Munt of Great Britain in the second. In the quarterfinals, Marissa and Widianto lost to Jens Eriksen and Mette Schjoldager of Denmark 15–12, 15–8. In September 2008 Marissa and her new partner Muhammad Rijal won in mixed doubles at the Japan Super Series after beating Nova Widianto/Liliyana Natsir 14–21, 21–15, 21–19 in the all Indonesian final.

In early 2009, she resigned from the Indonesia National Team and is no longer a PBSI player.

She continues her career as independent professional with her partner Flandy Limpele and her friend Nadya Melati, also a former national team player in women's doubles.

Olympic Games 
 2008 Summer Olympics at the Beijing University of Technology Gymnasium, Beijing, China

 2004 Summer Olympics at the Goudi Olympic Hall, Athens, Greece

Participation with Indonesian team 
 4 times at Sudirman Cup (1999, 2003, 2005, 2007)

Achievements

BWF World Championships 
Mixed doubles

Asian Games 
Mixed doubles

Asian Championships 
Women's doubles

Mixed doubles

Southeast Asian Games 
Women's doubles

Mixed doubles

World Junior Championships 
Girls' doubles

Asian Junior Championships 
Girls' doubles

BWF Superseries (5 titles, 5 runners-up) 
The BWF Superseries, which was launched on 14 December 2006 and implemented in 2007, was a series of elite badminton tournaments, sanctioned by the Badminton World Federation (BWF). BWF Superseries levels were Superseries and Superseries Premier. A season of Superseries consisted of twelve tournaments around the world that had been introduced since 2011. Successful players were invited to the Superseries Finals, which were held at the end of each year.

Marissa played with many partners such as Nova Widianto, Liliyana Natsir, Muhammad Rijal and Flandy Limpele.

Women's doubles

Mixed doubles

  BWF Superseries Finals tournament
  BWF Superseries Premier tournament
  BWF Superseries tournament

BWF Grand Prix (15 titles, 20 runners-up) 
The BWF Grand Prix had two levels, the Grand Prix and Grand Prix Gold. It was a series of badminton tournaments sanctioned by the Badminton World Federation (BWF) and played between 2007 and 2017. The World Badminton Grand Prix was sanctioned by the International Badminton Federation from 1983 to 2006.

Women's doubles

Mixed doubles

  BWF Grand Prix Gold tournament
  BWF & IBF Grand Prix tournament

BWF International Challenge/Series (2 titles, 1 runner-up)
Women's doubles

Mixed doubles

  BWF International Challenge tournament
  BWF International Series tournament

Performance timeline

National team 
 Junior level

 Senior level

Individual competitions 
 Junior level

 Senior level

Personal life 

When Marissa was young, she joined the Tangkas Jakarta badminton club. Her parents were Aris Harsono (father) and Yulianawati (mother). Her hobbies are billiards, swimming, and watching movies. Generally people call her Vita. After she has finished all competitions, no matter what the result were, she always makes a symbol of the Spirit of Jesus Christ. In 2008, as the oldest player in Uber Cup team, she was appointed as the team captain.

References

External links 

 
 
 

1981 births
Living people
Sportspeople from Jakarta
Indonesian female badminton players
Badminton players at the 2004 Summer Olympics
Badminton players at the 2008 Summer Olympics
Olympic badminton players of Indonesia
Badminton players at the 2002 Asian Games
Badminton players at the 2006 Asian Games
Asian Games bronze medalists for Indonesia
Asian Games medalists in badminton
Medalists at the 2002 Asian Games
Competitors at the 2001 Southeast Asian Games
Competitors at the 2007 Southeast Asian Games
Competitors at the 2011 Southeast Asian Games
Southeast Asian Games gold medalists for Indonesia
Southeast Asian Games silver medalists for Indonesia
Southeast Asian Games medalists in badminton
Badminton coaches
Indonesian Christians
20th-century Indonesian women
21st-century Indonesian women